The following television stations broadcast on digital or analog channel 11 in Canada:

 CBAFT-DT in Moncton, New Brunswick
 CFER-TV in Rimouski, Quebec
 CFGC-DT in Sudbury, Ontario
 CFJC-TV-8 in Chase, British Columbia
 CFRE-DT in Regina, Saskatchewan
 CFRN-TV-11 in Jasper, Alberta
 CFTF-DT-6 in Rivière-du-Loup, Quebec
 CHAN-TV-1 in Chilliwack, British Columbia
 CHAN-TV-4 in Courtenay, British Columbia
 CHAU-DT-8 in Cloridorme, Quebec
 CHCH-TV-7 in Timmins, Ontario
 CHTY-TV in Yellowknife, Northwest Territories
 CHWT-TV in Whitehorse, Yukon
 CIHF-TV-7 in Sydney, Nova Scotia
 CITO-TV-2 in Kearns, Ontario
 CJDC-TV-1 in Hudson's Hope, British Columbia
 CJDG-TV-2 in Lebel-sur-Quévillon, Quebec
 CJDG-TV-3 in Joutel, Quebec
 CKMI-DT-2 in Sherbrooke, Quebec
 CKNY-TV-11 in Huntsville, Ontario
 CKWS-DT in Kingston, Ontario
 CKYS-TV in Snow Lake, Manitoba

11 TV stations in Canada